Henry Gamble's Birthday Party is a 2015 drama film written and directed by Stephen Cone.

Plot

Henry Gamble is a closeted teenager and active member of a church youth group. He and his friend Gabe masturbate together while discussing a girl who will be at his birthday party tomorrow before falling asleep. The next morning the boys join the rest of the Gamble family for breakfast, before Henry’s 17th birthday party begins.

The party guests arrive and the film cuts between various storylines going on amongst them. Most of the party guests are members of the same church congregation, with the exception of some of Henry's school friends. One of the adult guests brings wine. Some of the adults are initially opposed to the wine, but by the end of the party most of them are either tipsy or drunk.

Bob Gamble is the patriarch of the family and head preacher of their church. Kat Gamble is the matriarch and also plays an active role in the church leadership. Their marriage is strained as Kat has had an affair and no longer has romantic feelings towards Bob. By the end of the film Kat tells Bob that she wants a break in the marriage, and that she intends on temporarily moving outside of their house. Kat encourages Bob to use their time apart to strengthen his relationship with Henry, and to accept their son's homosexuality.

Autumn, the elder Gamble child, is a freshman at a Christian college. She struggles with the loss of her virginity to her ex-boyfriend. Although it was a mutual decision to have sex, she feels a crisis of faith as a result of having sex before marriage. By the end of the film she has reconciled and gotten back together with her boyfriend.

Ricky is a party guest and member of the church congregation. He wishes to resume his duties as a camp chaperone for the church's annual summer camp, but church leadership is uncomfortable with this due to an incident from the previous year. Ricky was showering with some of the teenagers and they noticed he had an erection, prompting the kids to complain to the church. Noticing that many of the party goers feel uncomfortable around him, Ricky goes to the bathroom and has a nervous breakdown. He then takes a razor and severely lacerates his face, prompting his mother and various party guests to take him to the hospital.

Party guest Logan has unreciprocated romantic feelings for Henry. Throughout the party Henry is cold towards Logan, but by the end of the film Henry asks Logan to spend the night with him. Henry and Logan lie in bed together, and Henry apologizes for his behavior. Henry then asks Logan if he wants to kiss, to which Logan says yes.

Cast
Cole Doman as Henry Gamble
Pat Healy as Bob Gamble
Elizabeth Laidlaw as Kat Gamble
Nina Ganet as Autumn Gamble
Tyler Ross as Aaron
Francis Guinan as Larry Montgomery
Hanna Dworkin as Bonnie Montgomery
Darci Nalepa as Grace Montgomery
Patrick Andrews as Ricky Matthews
Meg Thalken as Rose Matthews
Kelly O'Sullivan as Candice Noble
Travis Knight as Keith Noble
Daniel Kyri as Logan
Joe Keery as Gabe
Mia Hulen as Emily
Jack Ball as Jon
Melanie Neilan as Christine
Grace Melon as Heather
Spencer Curnutt as Cooper
Zoe Tyson as Cheyenne

Production
The film had a principal production schedule of 18 days.

Release
The film was premiered on May 7, 2015 at the Maryland Film Festival. The film later premiered in New York City at the BAMcinemaFest on June 25, 2015.

Home media
On September 8, 2015, it was reported that Wolfe Video had acquired the rights to Henry Gamble's Birthday Party with plans to distribute the film on VOD and DVD in early 2016.

Reception

Critical response
Henry Gamble's Birthday Party received a generally positive response from critics. , the film holds an 83% approval rating on the review aggregator Rotten Tomatoes, based on twelve reviews with an average rating of 6.62/10. On Metacritic, the film has a score of 59 out of 100, based on 4 critics, indicating "mixed or average reviews".

Frank Scheck of The Hollywood Reporter described the film as a "somewhat less successful" work than Cone's similarly themed 2011 film The Wise Kids, but nevertheless lauded, "The film works best in its quieter moments, especially in its touching climactic scene in which Henry, sensitively portrayed by Doman in his film debut, finally allows himself to act on his suppressed impulses. It adds a welcome hopeful note to the preceding turmoil, reminding us yet again that the heart inevitably wants what it wants." Carson Kohler of Vox also praised the film, writing, "There are so many substantial issues that this birthday party illuminates. Sexuality. The church. Sexuality and the church. And that's one line of the issues." Joe Ehrman-Dupre of Indiewire praised the film as "miraculous" and wrote:

Ben Kenigsberg The New York Times gave the film a more mixed review, however, describing Cone as "not a sophisticated writer" and remarking, "Henry Gamble's Birthday Party feels sincere but not accomplished, empathetic but not deep."

Accolades
The film was awarded the SHOUT Jury Award and the Audience Narrative Award at the 2015 Sidewalk Moving Picture Festival.

References

External links

Criterion Channel

Films directed by Stephen Cone
2015 films
2015 independent films
American LGBT-related films
Films about LGBT and Christianity
Films about parties
Films about sexual repression
Films shot in Chicago
LGBT-related drama films
2015 LGBT-related films
2015 drama films
LGBT-related coming-of-age films
2010s English-language films
2010s American films